Shemaine Altia Campbelle (born 14 October 1992) is a Guyanese cricketer who plays as an all-rounder and occasional wicket-keeper. She plays internationally for the West Indies and domestic cricket for Guyana and Guyana Amazon Warriors.

Campbelle is the first and only woman cricketer to score a century in an ODI when batting at number 7 or lower and also has the highest score for any batswoman in a Women's ODI innings when batting at number 7 position or lower, with 105 not out. She is the youngest captain to play in WT20I match, aged 19 years and 338 days.

She was also the part of the victorious ICC Women's World T20 campaign of West Indies in 2016.

In October 2018, Cricket West Indies (CWI) awarded her a women's contract for the 2018–19 season. Later the same month, she was named in the West Indies' squad for the 2018 ICC Women's World Twenty20 tournament in the West Indies. In January 2020, she was named in West Indies' squad for the 2020 ICC Women's T20 World Cup in Australia. In their opening match of the tournament, against Thailand, Campbelle played in her 100th WT20I match. In May 2021, Campbelle was awarded with a central contract from Cricket West Indies.

In October 2021, she was named in the West Indies team for the 2021 Women's Cricket World Cup Qualifier tournament in Zimbabwe. In February 2022, she was named in the West Indies team for the 2022 Women's Cricket World Cup in New Zealand.

References

External links

1992 births
Living people
West Indian women cricketers
West Indies women One Day International cricketers
West Indies women Twenty20 International cricketers
Guyanese women cricketers
Guyana Amazon Warriors (WCPL) cricketers
West Indian women cricket captains